Nasir al-Fahd (also known as Nasir bin Hamad al-Fahd) is a Saudi Arabian Salafist Islamic scholar who supports jihadism and use of nuclear weapons against the United States. He was arrested in 2003 by the Saudi Arabian government after "preaching to his followers to rise up against the infidels" and has since been held without charge as a political prisoner.

Biography

Nasir al-Fahd was born in Riyadh, Saudi Arabia, in 1968 to a Saudi family. After finishing high school, he began to study engineering at Al-Malik Saud University. In his third year, he changed direction and left to study shari'a (Islamic law) . There he met several prominent sheikhs. He studied at College of Shari'a in Riyadh.

In 1992, al-Fahd was appointed as a dean at Umm al-Qura University. He was arrested in 1994 after writing a poem deriding the "loose morals" of the wife of Saudi Interior Minister Prince Nayef bin Abdulaziz Al Saud.
Al-Fahd and other clerics associated with this school, such as Ali al-Khudair and Sulaiman Al-Alwan, became influential among jihadists. They condemned the actions of the Saudi state and provided backing from the Quran for their positions. Al-Fahd wrote in support of the Taliban's destruction of the ancient Buddhas of Bamiyan in Afghanistan. He declared that any Muslim who aided the United States war effort in any manner in Afghanistan or Iraq was an infidel. In a 2003 fatwa, al-Fahd approved of the possession of Weapons of Mass Destruction by Muslim nations to protect Muslims from harm that could be caused by other countries possessing such weapons.

Al-Fahd was arrested in May 2003 by the Saudi Arabian government. He believes that the Saudi state is an apostate regime because it has supported the United States in some of their actions, such as allowing the presence of US troops in the Arabian peninsula to attack Iraq. He defines this as a war against Islam that is focused on killing Muslims.

On 16 November 2012, a fatwa was posted online that was attributed to al-Fahd. It said that the Jews were the greatest enemies of Islam and that jihad against them anywhere in the world is an important duty of Muslims.

Writings
Described as an "extremely bright, charismatic and a very prolific writer", some of his publications include:

al-dawla al-uthmaniyya wa mawqif da‘wat al-shaykh muhammad bin ‘abd al-wahhab minha [The Ottoman State and the Position of the Call of Sheikh Muhammad ibn Abd al-Wahhab on it], 1993.
haqiqat al-hadara al-islamiyya [The Truth of Muslim Civilisation], 1993.
shi‘r ahmad shawqi fi’l-mizan [The Poetry of Ahmad Shawqi in the Balance], 1994.

See also
Sulaiman Al-Alwan
Ali al-Khudair

References

Saudi Arabian prisoners and detainees
Saudi Arabian Sunni Muslim scholars of Islam
Living people
Saudi Arabian Salafis
Critics of Shia Islam
Saudi Arabian imams
Salafi jihadists
21st-century Muslim scholars of Islam
Prisoners and detainees of Saudi Arabia
Academic staff of Umm al-Qura University
1968 births